Pilica is a river in central Poland, the longest left tributary of the Vistula river, with a length of 333 kilometres (8th longest) and a basin area of 9,258 km2 (all in Poland).

It flows through the Polish Jura, after which it enters Central Polish Plains. Pilica flows into the Vistula near the village of Ostrowek, in a geographical region of Central Vistula Valley. In 1974, a dam was built near Sulejow, resulting in the creation of man-made reservoir Sulejow Lake, which has the area of 2,700 hectares. The region in the basin of the Pilica is sometimes called Nadpilicze, and the river itself marks boundary between Lesser Poland, and two other historical provinces of the country, Greater Poland and Mazovia.

The first "open-air river museum" in Poland, the Open-air museum of Pilica river, is located on the waterway and the Blue Springs nature reserve lies next to the river.

Towns
Pilica
 Szczekociny
Koniecpol
Przedbórz
Sulejów
Tomaszów Mazowiecki
Spała
Inowłódz
Nowe Miasto nad Pilicą
Wysmierzyce
Białobrzegi
Warka

Left tributaries
Luciąża
Rykolanka
Wolborka

Right tributaries
Czarna (Włoszczowska)
Czarna (Konecka)
Drzewiczka

A kayak route 
A 228 km long "Szlak wodny Pilicy" is a kayak route on Pilica River. It begins in Zarzecze near Szczekociny and ends on a mouth of the Pilica River. Points on the route:

Zarzecze near Szczekociny 
Przedbórz 
Faliszew 
Skotniki (Gmina Aleksandrów, Łódź Voivodeship)
Sulejów 
Sulejowski Reservoir 
Tomaszów Mazowiecki 
Spała 
Inowłódz 
Żądłowice 
Grotowice 
Domaniewice 
Nowe Miasto nad Pilicą 
Białobrzegi 
Warka 
a mouth of the Pilica River

A section of the river is a Natura 2000 EU Special Protection Area.

See also

Special Protection Areas in Poland

References

Rivers of Poland
Rivers of Łódź Voivodeship
Rivers of Silesian Voivodeship
Rivers of Świętokrzyskie Voivodeship
Rivers of Masovian Voivodeship
Natura 2000 in Poland